Saint-Denis-du-Maine is a commune in the Mayenne department in north-western France.

Geography
The Vaige forms most of the commune's eastern border.

See also
Communes of Mayenne

References

Saintdenisdumaine